Abrucena is a municipality of Almería province, in Spain.

Demographics

References

Municipalities in the Province of Almería